Benin competed at the 2015 World Aquatics Championships in Kazan, Russia from 24 July to 9 August 2015.

Swimming

Beninese swimmers have achieved qualifying standards in the following events (up to a maximum of 2 swimmers in each event at the A-standard entry time, and 1 at the B-standard):

Men

Women

References

External links
Kazan 2015 Official Site

Nations at the 2015 World Aquatics Championships
2015
World Aquatics Championships